The Wadrill is a river of Saarland and Rhineland-Palatinate, Germany. It is a right tributary of the Prims, which it joins south of Wadern.

See also
List of rivers of Saarland
List of rivers of Rhineland-Palatinate

References

Rivers of Saarland
Rivers of Rhineland-Palatinate
Rivers of Germany